James Olson (October 8, 1930 – April 17, 2022) was an American actor.

Life and career
Olson was born in Evanston, Illinois, on October 8, 1930, and he was a graduate of Northwestern University. From 1952 until 1954, he was a military policeman in the United States Army. He performed stage work in and around Chicago before his 1956 film debut in The Sharkfighters. 

His Broadway credits include Of Love Remembered (1967), Slapstick Tragedy (1966), The Three Sisters (1964), The Chinese Prime Minister (1964), Romulus (1962), J.B. (1958), The Sin of Pat Muldoon (1957), and The Young and Beautiful (1955).

He starred alongside Joanne Woodward in the Academy Award nominee for Best Picture Rachel, Rachel in 1968. He made numerous stage, feature film, and TV appearances from the mid-1950s until 1990, when he retired.

On television, Olson portrayed Mickey Mantle in The Life of Mickey Mantle. His other TV appearances included guest roles on scores of shows, including episodes of Kraft Television Theatre; Ironside; Murder, She Wrote; Little House on the Prairie; Hawaii Five-O; Battlestar Galactica; Lou Grant; The Bionic Woman; Wonder Woman; Mannix; Bonanza; Have Gun-Will Travel; Marcus Welby, M.D.; Police Woman; Barnaby Jones; The New Land; Columbo; Maude; The Virginian; The Streets of San Francisco; and Cannon.

Personal life and death
Olson died at his home in Malibu, California on April 17, 2022, at the age of 91. He was survived by two nieces, Susan Baker and Robin Olson, a nephew, David James Olson, and three grandnephews.

Selected filmography
The Sharkfighters (1956) as Ens. Harold Duncan
The Strange One (1957) as Roger Gatt
The Three Sisters (1966) as Baron Tuzenbach
Rachel, Rachel (1968) as Nick Kazlik
The Stalking Moon (1968) as Cavalry Officer (uncredited)
Moon Zero Two (1969) as Kemp
Crescendo (1970) as Georges Ryman / Jacques Ryman
The Andromeda Strain (1971) as Dr. Mark Hall
Wild Rovers (1971) as Joe Billings
Paper Man (1971) as Art Fletcher
Columbo: Etude in Black (1972, TV movie) as Paul Rifkin
The Groundstar Conspiracy (1972) as Sen. Stanton
Incident on a Dark Street (1973) as Joe Dubbs
The Missiles of October (1974, TV movie) as McGeorge Bundy, Special Assistant for National Security Affairs
The Spell (1977) as Glenn
The Mafu Cage (1978) as David
Ragtime (1981) as Father
Amityville II: The Possession (1982) as Father Adamsky
Cave-In! (1983) as Tom Arlen
Commando (1985) as Major General Franklin Kirby
Rachel River (1987) as Jack Canon

References

External links
 
 
 
 James Olson at Internet Off-Broadway Database
 James Olson at the University of Wisconsin's Actors Studio audio collection

1930 births
2022 deaths
20th-century American male actors
American male film actors
American male stage actors
American male television actors
Military personnel from Illinois
Northwestern University alumni
Male actors from Evanston, Illinois
Western (genre) television actors